Im Won-hee (born October 11, 1970) is a South Korean actor. Im was an alumnus of the legendary Daehak-ro theater troupe Mokhwa, starring in many of Jang Jin's stage plays. He made his film debut in Jang's black comedy The Happenings in 1998, and through the years has become one of the most versatile supporting actors in Korean cinema, with notable roles in Three... Extremes and Le Grand Chef. But Im is best known for his iconic role Dachimawa Lee, which began in 2000 as the title character of a 35-minute short film that director Ryoo Seung-wan made as a parody/homage to '70s Korean genre action films. The internet short was enormously popular and received more than a million page views, and in 2008, Ryoo again cast Im in an action-comedy feature film based on the same character, Dachimawa Lee.

Filmography

Film

Television series

Web series

Variety show

Theater
Rain Man (2009) - Raymond Babbitt
Leave When They're Applauding (2000)
Heotang (1999)
Taxi Driver (1997)
Romeo and Juliet (1995)

Awards and nominations

Notes

References

External links
 
 
 
 Im Won-hee fan cafe at Daum 

20th-century South Korean male actors
21st-century South Korean male actors
South Korean male film actors
South Korean male television actors
South Korean male stage actors
1970 births
Living people
People from Seoul
Seoul Institute of the Arts alumni